Blacktown is a suburb in the City of Blacktown, in the state of New South Wales, Australia. It is one of the most multicultural places within Greater Sydney.

History

Prior to the arrival of the First Fleet in 1788, the area of today's Blacktown was inhabited by different groups of the Darug people including the Warmuli, based around what is now Prospect, and their neighbours the Gomerigal from the South Creek area and the Wawarawarry from the Eastern Creek area.  It is estimated that fifty to ninety percent of the Darug died of smallpox and other introduced diseases within a few years of the British arrival. Governor Arthur Phillip began granting land in the area to white settlers in 1791.  In 1819 Governor Lachlan Macquarie granted land to two indigenous men, Colebee and Nurragingy as payment for their service to The Crown, for assisting Cox with the road over the Blue Mountains and in dealing with Aboriginal issues.

In 1823, the Native Institution (a school for Aboriginal children) was moved from Parramatta to the site where Richmond Road meets Rooty Hill Road North (this intersection is now in the suburbs of Oakhurst and Glendenning) which was named "The Blacks Town".  The institution was then known as Black Town Native Institute and it was synonymous with the stolen generation. Although the institution closed in 1833, the road heading out to the Institute became known as the Black Town Road. In 1860 the Railway Department gave the name of Black Town Road Station to the railway station at the junction of the railway and the Black Town Road, with the name shortening to Blacktown by 1862.

The arrival of the railway led to the formation of a town around the station. A post office was opened in 1862 and a school in 1877. In 1906, the Shire of Blacktown was formed and in 1930, electricity was introduced to the town. The population in 1933 was then around 13,000. In the 1950s and 1960s, there was a large amount of suburban development both in the current suburb of Blacktown and the new suburbs that sprung up around it. This led to civic development in the town centre with the hospital opening in 1965, the courthouse and police station in 1966, the library in 1967 and the TAFE college in 1969. In 1973, the Westpoint shopping centre opened which was soon followed by the cinema complex.

Climate 
Blacktown experiences a humid subtropical climate (Köppen: Cfa/Cfb, Trewartha: Cfbl/Cfal), with moderately hot, moderately rainy summers and cold, moderately dry winters, and experiences precipitation year-round. Like Greater Western Sydney, Blacktown has a greater annual temperature range between winter and summer, and receives less precipitation than on Sydney Observatory Park. 

Summers are moderately hot and humid, having a similar average temperature to Port Jackson, but diurnal temperature range is higher from the lack of coastal sea breezes from the Tasman Sea, which only make up to the suburb of Homebush, which is east of Blacktown, which also reduces summer precipitation . In addition, 29.6 days will exceed 30 ºC (86 ºF), which is more than twice as common compared to Observatory Park, which only records 11.1 days exceeding the same threshold. Extremes range from 41.7 ºC (107.1 ºF) on 30th December 1965 to 8.3 ºC (46.9 ºF) on 2nd February 1965.

Winters are cold and moderately dry. Due to its inland position further from the Tasman Sea, it typically records 11.0 nights below 5 ºC (41 ºF) and 2.3 nights below 0 ºC (32 ºF), which is cold compared to the Sydney CBD, which on an average year, records zero nights below 5 ºC (41 ºF), allowing light frosts on many winter mornings. Southwesterly winds, known as frontal lows often affect Blacktown in the winter, but lose much of their moisture over the Victorian Alps and Great Dividing Range, making this the driest season in Blacktown. Extremes range from 27.8 ºC (82.0 ºF) on 25th August 1972 to -3.9 ºC (25.0 ºF) on 16th July 1970.

Commercial area
The Blacktown Commercial Business District is located close to Blacktown railway station. Westpoint Blacktown is a major shopping centre and there are a number of small shops, restaurants and hotels in the surrounding area. Westpoint also houses a western suburb television studio of the Nine Network. The Blacktown CBD features the following landmarks:
 Blacktown City Council corporate head office
 Blacktown Courthouse
 Blacktown Hospital
 Blacktown Workers Club
 Cucina Locale Revolving Restaurant
 Max Webber Library – Blacktown City Council's newly completed central library
 Patrician Brothers' College Blacktown
 Nagle College Blacktown
A notable Blacktown retailer in the 1950s was Frank Lowy who conducted a delicatessen and small goods shop in Main Street.

Transport
According to the 2006 census, the most common way of getting to work from Blacktown was by car (74%) with public transport used by just under twenty percent. Most public transport was done by train (17%) with five percent catching buses for all or part of their journey. Blacktown railway station is on the North Shore & Western Line and the Cumberland Line of the Sydney Trains network. A major bus interchange is located next to the station and an underground bus station is at the entrance to Westpoint. Blacktown is a terminus of the North-West T-way.

Busways provides services to Northern areas (Rouse Hill, Castle Hill, Kellyville, Glenwood and Stanhope Gardens), West areas (Mount Druitt, Plumpton, Oakhurst, Quakers Hill, Dean Park, Woodcroft) and South districts (Prospect, Arndell Park, Huntingwood, Tallawong, Doonside, Blacktown Hospital), whilst Hillsbus provides Eastern services (Macquarie Park, Seven Hills, Parramatta, Kings Langley).

Schools

The first school, a single-storey brick building with gables, was opened in 1877. While no longer in use as a school, the building in Flushcombe Road is now used as a Visitor Information Centre. It is the oldest remaining building in the Blacktown CBD and is heritage-listed.

There are a large number of schools in the suburb. Government-run primary schools in the area include: Blacktown North Public School, Blacktown South Public School, Blacktown West Public School, Lynwood Park Public School, Marayong South Public School, Shelley Public School, and Walters Road Public School. Public high schools include: Blacktown Boys High School, Blacktown Girls High School, Evans High School and Mitchell High School. There is also the Coreen School, which caters to older children with learning difficulties.

There are two Catholic primary schools, St Michaels Primary School and St Patricks Primary School, and two Catholic high schools, Nagle College for girls and Patrician Brothers' College Blacktown for boys. Tyndale Christian School is a private school covering children from kindergarten to year 12.

Blacktown Arts Centre

Blacktown Arts Centre is located at 78 Flushcombe Road on the highest point of land in the Blacktown CBD.

Originally built in the 1950s as an Anglican church, the building was deconsecrated in 1999. Originally acquired by Blacktown Council as a site for a car park, the Council in partnership with Arts NSW subsequently refurbished the building as a multi-arts centre.

The centre opened to the public in October 2002. In 2006 the centre underwent a multimillion-dollar refit and extension. The building reopened in April 2007 with facilities for performance, extended visual art galleries, workshop space and enhanced administrative areas.

Sport and recreation
 Blacktown Stadium part of Blacktown Olympic park – capacity 10,000
 Fairfax Community Stadium (Used by NSWPL team Blacktown City Demons) –  7,500 capacity (1,200 seated)
 Blacktown Baseball Stadium (Baseball) 5,000 capacity (1,200 seated)
 Blacktown Softball Stadium (Softball) 5,000 capacity (1,100 seated)
 Blacktown Showground (festivals and cultural events/activities)
 Village Green & Civic Centre (Community events. Known as "Blacktown’s Dancers Lane")
PCYC Blacktown
 Blacktown Aquatic Center
 Blacktown Norwegian Ice Bathing Club
 Bungarribee Park
 Featherdale Wildlife Park
 Alpha Park
 Blacktown Olympic Park
 Grantham Reserve

Media 
Blacktown is served by local newspaper Blacktown Advocate and community radio station SWR Triple 9.

Population

Demographics
The most common countries of birth were India 13.3%, Philippines 5.4%, China 2.5%, New Zealand 2.2% and Fiji 2.0%. 44.2% of people only spoke English at home. Other languages spoken at home included Punjabi 8.9%, Hindi 5.0%, Arabic 4.0%, Tagalog 3.2% and Gujarati 2.4%. The most common responses for religion in Blacktown were Catholic 25.3%, No Religion 14.1%, Hinduism 12.3% and Anglican 8.6%.

Religious destinations

Islam 
Blacktown Mosque and Ghausia Masjid serve as the main Islamic religious places for the area.

Hinduism 
No proper temples exist, however the Hindu Priest/Pundit Nitish Joshi offers pooja and ritual services.

Notable people
 Josh Addo-Carr, rugby league footballer for the Canterbury-Bankstown Bulldogs
 Blake Austin, rugby league footballer
 Kurtley Beale, rugby union player for the Wasps RFC and Australia
 Bob Brown, a former Greens Australian Senator, was raised here
 Reagan Campbell-Gillard, rugby league footballer for the Penrith Panthers was born here
 Charles Casuscelli RFD MP, Member for Strathfield NSW Parliament was raised here
 Anita Cobby, murder victim, lived with her parents in Blacktown at the time of her death
 Darren Coleman, rugby union coach
 Toni Collette, actress
 Ben Creagh, rugby league, player for the St. George Illawarra Dragons
 Damian Cudlin, a professional motorcycle racer, was born here
 Brett Delaney, rugby league footballer was born and raised here
 Joel Edgerton, actor
 Andrew Fifita, rugby league footballer for the Cronulla-Sutherland Sharks
 David Fifita, rugby league footballer
 Danny Galea, rugby league footballer, lived and went to school here
 Mark Geyer, rugby league footballer for the Penrith Panthers
 Matt Geyer, rugby league footballer for the Melbourne Storm
 Wade Graham, rugby league footballer for the Cronulla Sharks was born here
 Timothy Hodge, Paralympic swimmer
 Calum Hood, bassist of 5 Seconds of Summer
 Hush, A Glam Rock Band formed in 1971 in Seven Hills
 Brad Izzard, rugby league footballer
 George Jennings, rugby league footballer
 Michael Jennings, rugby league footballer for the Parramatta Eels
 Robert Jennings, rugby league footballer
 Julian Karikalan, Filmmaker
 Felix Lee, member of South Korean boy group Stray Kids
 Frank Lowy, Czech-born, Australia's leading philanthropist began his new life in Australia in Blacktown
 Feleti Mateo, rugby league footballer was born and raised here
 Taylan May, rugby league footballer
 Tyrone May, rugby league footballer
 Daniel Mookhey, politician for the NSW Labor Party
 Matt Moylan, rugby league footballer
 Northlane, a metalcore band formed in 2009
 Marlisa Punzalan, winner of the sixth season of The X Factor Australia
 The Radiators, A pub rock pop band formed in 1978
 Jarrod Sammut, rugby league footballer
 Gurinder Sandhu, Australian cricketer
 Kyah Simon, soccer player for the Melbourne City FC and Australia
 Will Skelton, rugby union player for the NSW Waratahs and Australia
 Thy Art Is Murder, a deathcore band formed in 2006
 Mark Winterbottom, V8 Supercar driver for Ford
 Matthew Wright, rugby league footballer was raised here

References

External links

 Historic Sites of Blacktown
 http://www.cucinalocale.com.au/
 Blacktown and District Historical Society
 SYDNEY.com – Blacktown
   [CC-By-SA] 
  [CC-By-SA] 
 History of The Blacktown Show

 
Suburbs of Sydney
Populated places established in 1821
1821 establishments in Australia
City of Blacktown